Oludoyi Julius Juwon (born June 5, 1995) is a Nigerian business man, realtor, auto dealer and investor. In 2017, He was the youngest ever in the history of Kogi state to occupy the position of the Special Adviser; Office of the Executive Chairman, Kogi State Universal Basic Education. He currently runs an auto dealership company, Mr. Jay Autos LLC.

Early life and education
Born to the family of Otunba Dr. Paul and Mrs. Helen Oludoyi with both parents from Kogi, Juwon was the youngest of four children, having two sisters and a brother. He completed his secondary and tertiary school education at Harmony School, Kogi before he proceeded to Salem University, Lokoja) where he graduated with a B.Sc in International Relations and Diplomacy. He held the position of the President of International Relations and Diplomacy Student Association that led a student delegation to Minister of Foreign Affairs (Nigeria) and ECOWAS Commission.

Career
Shortly after receiving his bachelor's degree in  International Relations and Diplomacy in 2015, Juwon worked with the Institute of Peace and Conflict Resolution in the Minister of Foreign Affairs (Nigeria).

In January 2017, he was appointed as the Special Adviser (SA); Office of the Executive Chairman, Kogi State Universal Basic Education (SUBEB) under the leadership of the current governor Alhaji Yahaya Bello.

He was awarded the Kogi State youth Ambassador award in June of the same year, an appraisal system organized by the office of the Special Adviser to the Governor on Youth and Sport. A month after, he resigned his appointment to further his studies in United States of America and set up his car dealership business registered as Mr. Jay Autos LLC in Dallas, Texas.

Personal life
Oludoyi Julius Juwon is currently unmarried.

References

5.

 6. https://www.independent.ng/covid-19-what-fg-must-do-to-ease-nigerians-pain-mr-jay-autos/ Independent Ng

 7. https://akahinews.org/covid-19-what-fg-must-do-to-ease-nigerians-pain-mr-jay-autos/ akahi news

External links

1995 births
Living people
Nigerian business executives
Businesspeople from Kogi State
Salem University, Lokoja alumni
Nigerian socialites
Nigerian real estate businesspeople
Nigerian investors
Nigerian self-help writers
21st-century Nigerian businesspeople